ISO 31-10 is the part of international standard ISO 31 that defines names and symbols for quantities and units related to nuclear reactions and ionizing radiations. It gives names and symbols for 70 quantities and units. Where appropriate, conversion factors are also given.

Its definitions include:

00031-10